Louis Bamberger (15 May 1855 – 11 March 1944) was the leading citizen of Newark, New Jersey, from the early 1900s until his death in 1944.  He and his sister Caroline Bamberger Fuld co-founded the Institute for Advanced Study in Princeton, New Jersey.  He was a businessman and philanthropist and at his death all flags in Newark were flown at half-staff for three days, and his large department store closed for a day.

Early life
Louis Bamberger was born in 1855 to a German Jewish family in Baltimore, Maryland, the son of Theresa (née Hutzler) and Elkan Bamberger. His mother belonged to the family that ran Hutzler Brothers  in Baltimore. His grandfather was Moses Hutzler. He had six siblings: Caroline Bamberger Fuld; Clara "Lavinia" Bamberger; Rosa Bamberger; Julius Bamberger; Pauline Bamberger; and Julia Bamberger.

Bamberger's
He came to Newark in 1892 and bought at auction a failing general goods store on Market Street, renaming it L. Bamberger & Company, with his partners, brothers-in-law Felix Fuld and Louis M. Frank,. The store was an immediate success, and Bamberger was able to open an ornate chateauesque building in 1912 that covered a whole city block. For decades, Bamberger’s clock was the downtown meeting place for Newarkers. In 1928, the store's sales were $28 million (equivalent to $ million in ), making it the fourth highest grossing store in the United States.

In 1929, Bamberger sold his department store to R.H. Macy and Company, which kept the original Bamberger name. Bamberger knew that he owed his success to hundreds of able employees, and split $1 million among 240 employees. The Bamberger name remained in use for the stores in the New Jersey division of Macy's until 1986.

Charitable work
Bamberger supported both secular and Jewish charities. Bamberger personally funded the buildings for Newark’s YMHA,  the Newark Museum, and the New Jersey Historical Society. He worked to help persecuted Jews escape from Germany's Third Reich. Bamberger was also a major contributor to the Community Chest and Beth Israel Hospital.

Institute for Advanced Study 
Bamberger and his sister Caroline Bamberger Fuld worked with Abraham Flexner to found the Institute for Advanced Study in Princeton, New Jersey.  They gave a $5 million endowment to the Institute. Upon Bamberger's death the bulk of his estate was left to the Institute.

Personal life 
Bamberger was a shy man who never married and focused on running his store.  His partner Felix Fuld was the more outgoing of the two, and his sister Caroline Bamberger Fuld was most involved in the charity activities of the family.

Legacy and honors
The World War II Liberty Ship  was named in his honor.

References

1855 births
1944 deaths
Jewish American philanthropists
Institute for Advanced Study people
American people of German-Jewish descent
Businesspeople from Baltimore
Businesspeople from Newark, New Jersey
Hutzler family